Pinchoo Kapoor (1927 – April 28, 1989) was an Indian actor born in Rawalpindi, Punjab, British India in 1927. He acted in many Hindi films during the 1970s and 1980s. His film career lasted from 1969 to 1989. He is best remembered for his role in the films Don, Roti, Avtaar and Khud-Daar.

Kapoor died aged 62 on 28 April 1989 in Bombay.

Filmography

References

External links

Male actors from Jaipur
1989 deaths
Male actors in Hindi cinema
Indian male film actors
People from Rawalpindi
Pahari Pothwari people
Punjabi Hindus
20th-century Indian male actors
1929 births